France Bleu Vaucluse is a regional radio station broadcasting in Vaucluse and surrounding areas. It covers regional news, sports, culture, etc. The headquarters are located in Avignon. The station broadcasts 88.6FM for Castellet, 98.8FM for Avignon-le-Pontet and 100.4FM for Avignon-Mont-Ventoux.

History 
The station began operating as "Radio Vaucluse" on June 29, 1982, announced 4 days prior. Along with the regional stations, it was brought together on September 4, 2000, and was accordingly renamed "France Bleu Vaucluse".

Programming 
France Bleu Vaucluse programs are broadcast live from 6 a.m. to 1 a.m., and 4:30 p.m. to 7:30 p.m. Monday to Friday, and from 7 a.m. to 12:30 p.m. and 4 to 7 p.m.on weekends. The national programs are broadcast the rest of the day and night.

Like with all of the regional stations, Vaucluse has its own regional-specific flagship shows, such as the local weather report "Happy Hour"  from 16 h to 19 h. "Aqui sian bèn" (Sunday 11 h) as well as the chronicles "Le parler provençal" with Médéric Gasquet-Cyrus,  and "Un jour en Vaucluse " with Philippe Garcia, "Le baladeur" with Maxime Peyron, "L'invité immanquable" with Pascale Lorens or "Un trésor dans mon musée" with David Peron.

References 

Radio stations in France
Radio stations established in 1982
1982 establishments in France
Radio France